Susan Doran is a British historian whose primary studies surround the reign of Elizabeth I, in particular the theme of marriage and succession. She has published and edited sixteen books, notably Elizabeth I and Religion, 1558-1603, Monarchy and Matrimony and Queen Elizabeth I, the last part of the British Library's Historic Lives series.

Doran is the former Director of Studies for history at Regent's Park College, Oxford and Senior Research Fellow for History at Jesus College, Oxford, where her specific area of interest is  Early Modern British and European history. Doran was the temporary master of St Benet’s Hall for one year. Doran teaches Early Modern History at St John’s, Magdalen and Regents Park College. Previously, Doran was a Reader in history and Director of the History Programme at St Mary's College, Strawberry Hill, part of the University of Surrey.

Works

Footnotes

English historians
Living people
Fellows of St Benet's Hall, Oxford
Fellows of Jesus College, Oxford
Academics of the University of Surrey
Fellows of Regent's Park College, Oxford
Year of birth missing (living people)